The Blue Mountains are a mountain range located in the northeastern Ituri Province of the Democratic Republic of the Congo.  To the east the range overlooks Lake Albert, at the confluence of the Victoria Nile and Albert Nile, which form part of the border with Uganda.  The western slopes of the Blue Mountains give rise to the Ituri River, a tributary of the Congo River. They reach heights of up to 2,000 meters.

Notes and references

Further reading 
 The Blue Mountains, Zaire: population and economy of an equatorial African mountain region by B. Wiese, Kolner Geographische Arbeiten, Sonderfolge: Beitrage zur Landerkunde Afrikas. Steiner, Wiesbaden, Germany, Fed. Rep., 1979. (8)xviii, 273 p. 

Mountain ranges of the Democratic Republic of the Congo